The Hawaiians were a professional American football team based in Honolulu that played in the World Football League. They played two seasons, 1974 and 1975.  Their records were 9–11 in 1974 and 4–7–1 in 1975. Their home stadium was  Honolulu Stadium in 1974 and Aloha Stadium in 1975. The best known player to play for the Hawaiians was former Dallas Cowboys running back Calvin Hill, though quarterback Jim Fassel became better known as a head coach decades later. The Hawaiians head coach was Michael Giddings who guided the Hawaiians through both the 1974 and 1975 World Football League seasons.

The franchise was originally going to be called the Honolulu Warriors, but a local team had trademarked that name. As a result, the team was known simply as "The Hawaiians", although the press frequently mistakenly called them the "Honolulu Hawaiians" or the "Hawaii Hawaiians."  They were owned by real estate developer Christopher Hemmeter for the first season.  He was named league president in 1975, and sold the Hawaiians to jewel merchant Edward Sultan, Jr.

Though lasting for less than two seasons of play, the Hawaiians represented a serious attempt to form a viable professional football organization, one that at least had the potential for success had the WFL been better run.  They were one of only three teams that did not miss a payroll during the league's first season. (False accounts had said some players released from the team could not afford to get to the mainland.) Hemmeter and his original partner, Sam Battisone (who also owned the NBA's New Orleans Jazz) were among the few owners thought to be capable of fielding a team in 1975.

It was the first and, to date, only major professional American football team to establish its home base outside the contiguous 48 states.

Schedule and results

1974 regular season
Source

Playoffs

1975 regular season
Source

See also
 1974 World Football League season
 1975 World Football League season

References

External links
 The Hawaiians on FunWhileItLasted.net

Defunct American football teams

American football teams established in 1974
1974 establishments in Hawaii
1975 disestablishments in Hawaii
American football teams disestablished in 1975